Sackville is a surname. Notable people with the surname include:

 Duke of Dorset (also Earl of Dorset), various individuals whose family name is Sackville
 Thomas Sackville, 1st Earl of Dorset (1527–1608)
 Sir William Sackville (c. 1570–1592), English army officer in the service of Henry IV of France, son of the 1st earl
 Robert Sackville, 2nd Earl of Dorset (1561–1609)
 Lady Margaret Sackville (1562–1591), wife of the 2nd earl
 Anne Sackville, Countess of Dorset (died 1618), 2nd wife of the 2nd earl
 Richard Sackville, 3rd Earl of Dorset (1589–1624)
 Edward Sackville, 4th Earl of Dorset (1590–1652)
 Richard Sackville, 5th Earl of Dorset (1622–1677)
 Charles Sackville, 6th Earl of Dorset (1638–1706)
 Mary Sackville, Countess of Dorset (1669–1691)
 Lionel Sackville, 1st Duke of Dorset (1688–1765)
 Charles Sackville, 2nd Duke of Dorset (1711–1769)
 John Sackville, 3rd Duke of Dorset (1745–1799)
 George Sackville, 4th Duke of Dorset (1793–1815)
 Earl De La Warr
 Reginald Sackville, 7th Earl De La Warr (1817–1896)
 Lady Margaret Sackville (1881–1963), English poet and children's author, daughter of the 7th earl
 Gilbert Sackville, 8th Earl De La Warr (1869–1915)
 Lady Idina Sackville (1893–1955), member of the notoriously hedonistic Happy Valley set, daughter of the 8th earl
 Herbrand Sackville, 9th Earl De La Warr (1900–1976)
 William Sackville, 10th Earl De La Warr (1921–1988)
 William Sackville, 11th Earl De La Warr (born 1948)
 William Sackville, Lord Buckhurst (born 1979), the heir apparent
 Viscount Sackville
 George Germain, 1st Viscount Sackville (1716–1785), British soldier and politician, styled the Honourable George Sackville until 1720 and Lord George Sackville from 1720 to 1770
 Amy Sackville (born 1981), British writer
 Edward Sackville (disambiguation)
 John Sackville (disambiguation)
 Richard Sackville (disambiguation)
 Ronald Sackville, Australian judge from 1994 to 2019
 Thomas Sackville (disambiguation)

See also
 Sackville-Baggins, fictional family in The Lord of the Rings